Espa is a village in Stange Municipality in Innlandet county, Norway. Its population (SSB 2005) was 191. The Dovrebanen railway line passes through the village. There was a train station in the village, but it was closed in 1983.

References

Stange
Villages in Innlandet